Giorgio Gandini del Grano (died 1538) was an Italian painter  of the Parma school of painting. He was selected in 1535 to complete decoration of the apse of the Parma Cathedral. He was alleged to have been a pupil of Antonio da Correggio. His masterpiece is the St. Michael altar-piece now in the National Gallery at Parma.

References

1538 deaths
16th-century Italian painters
Italian male painters
Painters from Parma
Renaissance painters
Year of birth unknown